Claudio Coldebella (born 25 June 1968) is an Italian former professional basketball player, coach and executive.

Playing as point guard, he had a successful club career in Italy, where he won three Italian LBA titles, and Greece, where he reached a EuroLeague Final, and won a Greek Cup.

He also played internationally for Italy, most notably earning a silver medal at the EuroBasket 1997.

Professional career
The Veneto born Coldebella started his career with local side Basket Mestre of the second division Serie A2, staying two years. Moving to another A2 side, Aurora Desio, he posted 11.8 points and 2.3 steals in 1988–1989.

He caught the eye of top tier LBA side Virtus Bologna, who signed him in 1989. Coldebella stayed 7 years with Virtus, winning three consecutive Serie A titles between 1993 and 1995. The Italian moved to the Greek Basket League in 1996, joining AEK.

With the Athens side, he reached the 1998 EuroLeague Final, losing the European elite competition match up to former club Virtus. He changed teams in 1998, but stayed in Greece, joining PAOK. He helped the Thessaloniki team win the Greek Cup in 1999, also playing in the league All Star Game the same season. Coldebella stayed in Greece until 2002, and he is still highly regarded in the country.

He then returned to Italy, joining Olimpia Milano, he captained the side from 2003 to 2006, the year he ended his career.

National team career
Coldebella made his debut with the senior Italian national team in 1989. After playing in the EuroBasket 1993 and EuroBasket 1995 without much collective success, he was nearly third time lucky in EuroBasket 1997, after reaching the final, but losing to Yugoslavia.
He earned a silver medal after the game, which proved to be his last for Italy.

During that time, he also played for Italy in the 1993 Mediterranean Games (winning gold) and the 1994 Goodwill Games, where Italy beat the United States (composed of college players available to play, including Damon Stoudamire) in the semifinal, later earning silver.

Honours and awards

Club

Italian Cup Winner: (1990)
FIBA Saporta Cup Champion: (1990)
3× Italian League Champion: (1993, 1994, 1995)
Italian SuperCup Winner: (1995)
2× Greek League All-Star: (1998, 1999)
Greek Cup Winner: (1999)

Italian national team

Mediterranean Games: 1993 Languedoc-Roussillon 
Goodwill Games: 1994 St. Petersburg 
EuroBasket 1997 Spain

References

External links
Lega Basket Serie A profile Retrieved 18 June 2015 
Greek Basket League profile Retrieved 18 June 2015

1968 births
Living people
AEK B.C. players
Competitors at the 1993 Mediterranean Games
Competitors at the 1994 Goodwill Games
Goodwill Games medalists in basketball
Italian basketball coaches
Italian expatriate basketball people in Greece
Italian men's basketball players
Italian sports executives and administrators
Lega Basket Serie A players
Mediterranean Games gold medalists for Italy
Mediterranean Games medalists in basketball
Mediterranean Games silver medalists for Italy
Olimpia Milano players
P.A.O.K. BC players
People from Castelfranco Veneto
Point guards
Sportspeople from the Province of Treviso
Virtus Bologna players